Stephen Sean Ford (né Lunsford; born November 25, 1989) is an American actor and internet content producer. He played the titular character in The CW's Kamen Rider: Dragon Knight.

Early life
Ford was born in Sacramento, California. His parents sent him to acting class in elementary school to keep him out of trouble.

Career
Ford participated in Looking Ahead, a youth program sponsored by the Actors Fund of America, as a teen. He was a member of the Leadership Council from 2006 to 2007. He began producing his own independent videos on YouTube in 2006. His content consisted of parodies of blockbuster films such as Inception, Twilight, and The Hangover.

Ford's early roles included minor characters in Zoey 101, Bratz, and Victorious. In 2009, he was cast in the main role for the kids' TV show Kamen Rider: Dragon Knight. Ford co-starred in the horror films Maneater and Beneath the Darkness. In 2012, he was cast as Matt Daehler in a recurring role on Teen Wolf. Ford appeared in the psychological thriller film Homecoming, released on December 31, 2013.

In 2014, shortly after his role on Switched at Birth, he took a hiatus from acting. In 2016, he started working for YouTube gaming channel Machinima as a host, editor, and producer for a variety of content. This sub-channel, Ascender, focused on live action adaptations of video games, starting with SIXERS, based on Ubisoft's Rainbow Six: Siege. Ford parted ways with the company, taking the Ascender channel with him, using it to rebrand his own production company.

Filmography

References

External links
 
 

1989 births
American male television actors
Living people
Male actors from Sacramento, California
American male film actors
21st-century American male actors